The Mount Cass Wind Farm is a proposed wind farm to be located east of Waipara on Mount Cass in the Canterbury region of New Zealand.  It will comprise up to 70 wind turbines along 7 km of a ridge on Mount Cass. Construction is scheduled to begin in late 2021.

History
MainPower initially applied for resource consent from the Hurunui District Council in November 2007. In April 2009 the consents were declined on the basis that the site was an outstanding natural feature of national significance. The decision was appealed to the Environment Court, which granted consent in December 2011. The consent was originally due to lapse in February 2020, but was extended until 2025.

Preliminary work on construction began in December 2019. Work was interrupted in December 2020 by the possible discovery of a colony of critically endangered New Zealand long-tailed bats on a nearby property. In April 2021 wildlife monitoring determined that there were no bats present. Construction is now scheduled to begin in late 2021.

See also

Wind power in New Zealand
List of power stations in New Zealand

References

External links
Mainpower - Mount Cass Wind Farm information
A Ridge Too Far - Mt Cass Protection Society

Proposed wind farms in New Zealand
Buildings and structures in Canterbury, New Zealand